Major General David John Rutherford-Jones  (born 11 August 1958) is a retired British Army officer and former Commandant of the Royal Military Academy Sandhurst.

Early life
Rutherford-Jones was born on 11 August 1958 and educated at Lancing College, West Sussex, from 1972 to 1976.

Military career
After attending the Royal Military Academy, Sandhurst, Rutherford-Jones was commissioned into the 15th/19th Hussars as a second lieutenant on 6 August 1977. He was promoted to lieutenant on 6 August 1979, to captain on 6 February 1984, and major on 30 September 1990. In 1991, he commanded B squadron, 15th/19th Hussars during a 6-month tour of duty as part of the United Nations Peacekeeping Force in Cyprus.

Rutherford-Jones served as Chief of Staff of 1st Mechanised Brigade from 1993 to 1996. He was promoted to lieutenant colonel on 30 June 1996. He served at Supreme Headquarters Allied Powers Europe as a Staff Officer (Class 1) in the Joint Operation Centre from 1996 to 1997 and was Chief of Staff of 3rd (UK) Division prior to the Kosovo War. He was then commanding officer of The Light Dragoons. While CO, the regiment served for a time in the Balkans. He was promoted to colonel on 30 June 2000, and to brigadier on 31 December 2001 with seniority from 30 June 2001.

He commanded 20th Armoured Brigade during tours of duty in Kosovo (2001/02) and Iraq (2003/04). In 2005 to 2007, he was Director of the Royal Armoured Corps. On 14 August 2007, he was promoted to major general and appointed Commandant of the Royal Military Academy Sandhurst. In September 2009, he became Military Secretary, retiring from the post in February 2011.

He retired on 25 May 2011.

Later life
Upon retirement, he became Chief Executive of the charity Morden College. He has been a trustee of Blind Veterans UK since 2011.

Personal life
Rutherford-Jones is married to Sarah and has two children: George and Alice.

Honours and decorations
Rutherford-Jones was awarded the Queen's Commendation for Valuable Service "in recognition of gallant and distinguished services in the former Yugoslavia during the period 1st October 2001 to 31st March 2002". He was appointed Companion of the Order of the Bath (CB) in the 2010 Queen's Birthday Honours.

He was appointed Aide de Camp to Queen Elizabeth II on 12 December 2005. His tenure expired on 1 October 2007. On 31 October 2009, he was appointed Colonel Commandant of the Royal Corps of Army Music.

References

|-
 

Graduates of the Royal Military Academy Sandhurst
People educated at Lancing College
1958 births
Living people
British Army generals
15th/19th The King's Royal Hussars officers
Light Dragoons officers
13th/18th Royal Hussars officers
British Army personnel of the Iraq War
Commandants of Sandhurst
Companions of the Order of the Bath
Recipients of the Commendation for Valuable Service